Lake Whitney State Park is a state park located in Hill County, Texas, near Whitney, Texas.

History 
Lake Whitney was created in 1951 when the U.S. Army Corps of Engineers constructed a dam on the Brazos River in order to prevent flooding in downstream communities such as Waco. The park was opened in 1965.

Recreation 
The park offers nature programs throughout the year. The park has facilities for fishing, swimming, boating, water skiing, nature study, hiking, biking, wildlife observation, geocaching, and camping. Camping facilities include both campsites and screened shelters.

Nature 
The park lies on the Washita Prairie, and features both grasslands and woodlands. Wildlife includes raccoons, squirrels, foxes, coyotes, bobcats, and over 100 species of birds.

See also 

 List of Texas state parks

References

External links 

 Official Site

State parks of Texas
Protected areas of Hill County, Texas
Protected areas established in 1965
1965 establishments in Texas